Alien Nation is an American science fiction media franchise.

Alien Nation may also refer to:

Alien Nation media franchise
 Alien Nation (film), a 1988 motion picture that spawned the franchise
 Alien Nation (comics), comics tie-ins to the franchise
 Alien Nation (novel series), a series of novel tie-ins to the franchise
 Alien Nation (TV series), a 1989–1990 television series based on the film

Other uses
 Alien Nation (album), a comedy album by George Lopez
 "Alien Nation", a song by Scorpions from Face the Heat
 Alien Nation: Common Sense About America's Immigration Disaster, a 1995 book by Peter Brimelow

See also
Alienation (disambiguation)